The 2017 Extreme Rules was the ninth annual Extreme Rules professional wrestling pay-per-view and livestreaming event produced by WWE. It was held exclusively for wrestlers from the promotion's Raw brand division. The event took place on June 4, 2017, at the Royal Farms Arena in Baltimore, Maryland, and was the second Extreme Rules event to take place at this venue after the 2010 edition when the arena was still called the 1st Mariner Arena (renamed to Royal Farms Arena in 2014). It was also the only brand-exclusive Extreme Rules event to be held during either of WWE's brand extension periods. The concept of Extreme Rules is that the event features various hardcore-based matches.

Seven matches were contested at the event, including one match on the Kickoff pre-show. Only three of the main card's matches were contested under a hardcore stipulation. In the main event, Samoa Joe defeated Roman Reigns, Seth Rollins, Finn Bálor, and Bray Wyatt in an Extreme Rules Fatal Five-way match to earn a Universal Championship match at Great Balls of Fire. On the undercard, Cesaro and Sheamus defeated The Hardy Boyz (Jeff Hardy and Matt Hardy) in a Steel Cage match to win their second Raw Tag Team Championship as a team, and in the opening bout, The Miz defeated Dean Ambrose to win his seventh Intercontinental Championship.

Production

Background 
Extreme Rules is an annual gimmick pay-per-view (PPV) and WWE Network event produced by WWE since 2009. The concept of the show is that the event features various matches that are contested under hardcore rules and generally features one Extreme Rules match. The defunct Extreme Championship Wrestling promotion, which WWE acquired in 2003, originally used the "extreme rules" term to describe the regulations for all of its matches; WWE adopted the term and has since used it in place of "hardcore match" or "hardcore rules". The 2017 Extreme Rules event was the ninth event under the Extreme Rules chronology. It was held exclusively for wrestlers from the Raw brand, following the reintroduction of the brand extension in July 2016, where WWE again split its roster between the Raw and SmackDown brands, where wrestlers were exclusively assigned to perform. The event took place on June 4, 2017, at the Royal Farms Arena in Baltimore, Maryland, marking the second Extreme Rules event to take place at this venue after the 2010 edition when the arena was still called the 1st Mariner Arena (renamed to Royal Farms Arena in 2014).

Storylines 
The card included seven matches, including one on the Kickoff pre-show, that resulted from scripted storylines, where wrestlers portrayed villains, heroes, or less distinguishable characters in scripted events that built tension and culminated in a wrestling match or series of matches, with results predetermined by WWE's writers on the Raw brand. Storylines were produced on WWE's weekly television shows Monday Night Raw and 205 Live, the latter of which is cruiserweight-exclusive.

At Payback, Seth Rollins defeated Samoa Joe, giving Joe his first loss since debuting on the main roster. The following night on Raw, Rollins stated that his business with Joe was done. He then turned his attention to Universal Champion Brock Lesnar, however, Finn Bálor came out and stated that he should be the next person to face Lesnar as Bálor was the inaugural champion and never lost the title. The two then participated in an Intercontinental Championship number one contender's triple threat match, also including The Miz, who won following interference from Samoa Joe, who attacked Rollins, and Bray Wyatt, who performed Sister Abigail on Bálor. Also at Payback, Braun Strowman defeated Roman Reigns in the main event. After the match, Strowman continued to attack Reigns, but Reigns retaliated by slamming an ambulance door on Strowman's arm multiple times. On the May 8 episode of Raw, Strowman indicated his desire to face Lesnar for the Universal Title after he was finished with Reigns. Later that night, Reigns attacked Strowman during his match against Kalisto, targeting his arm with a steel chair. It was then revealed that Strowman required surgery on his injured arm, and would be inactive for up to six months. Due to Strowman's situation and the need for a number one contender, General Manager Kurt Angle scheduled a #1 contender's Extreme Rules fatal five-way match for Extreme Rules between Reigns, Rollins, Joe, Bálor, and Wyatt. Later on Raw, Reigns defeated Bálor and Rollins defeated Wyatt by disqualification after Joe attacked Rollins. The following week, Wyatt opened the show, stating that he would be the one to defeat Lesnar. Reigns came out, followed by Angle, who scheduled a match between the two that Reigns won by disqualification when Joe interfered and attacked Reigns. Rollins then came out and attacked Joe. Angle then scheduled Reigns and Rollins to face Wyatt and Joe in the main event, which Wyatt and Joe won. Also in the show, Bálor's in-ring promo was interrupted by Lesnar's advocate Paul Heyman, who said that he wanted to see Bálor face Lesnar. For the final Raw before Extreme Rules, Angle scheduled a triple threat match between Bálor, Joe, and Wyatt, which Joe won, and a singles match between Reigns and Rollins, which Reigns won.

On the May 1 episode of Raw, Dean Ambrose interrupted an argument between Seth Rollins and Finn Bálor over who should face Brock Lesnar for the Universal Championship. Ambrose criticized Lesnar for not appearing and wrestling often and claimed his Intercontinental Championship to be the top title of the Raw brand. The Miz then came out and said that he should be the one to face Ambrose for the title. A #1 contender's match for Ambrose's title was scheduled between Rollins, Bálor, and Miz, who won the match after Samoa Joe attacked Rollins and Bray Wyatt attacked Bálor with Sister Abigail. On the May 15 episode of Raw, Miz received his Intercontinental Championship match against Ambrose, which Miz won by disqualification after Ambrose low blowed Miz, who had attempted a low blow on Ambrose. Later, Ambrose was scheduled to defend his Intercontinental Championship against The Miz at Extreme Rules with the stipulation being that if Ambrose were disqualified, he would lose the title. The following week, The Miz interfered in Ambrose's match against Elias Samson, who was having his Raw in-ring debut. Instead of attacking Ambrose, Miz attacked Samson, making Ambrose lose by disqualification. Ambrose chased after Miz, but Samson attacked Ambrose with a rolling cutter.

At Payback, The Hardy Boyz (Jeff Hardy and Matt Hardy) retained the Raw Tag Team Championship against Cesaro and Sheamus. After the match, Cesaro and Sheamus attacked The Hardys, turning heel. The next night on Raw, Cesaro and Sheamus explained their reasoning for attacking The Hardy Boyz by calling them a novelty act and criticized the fans for living in the past instead of appreciating the present and claimed that The Hardys stole their moment at WrestleMania 33. The Hardys then appeared and ran Cesaro and Sheamus out of the ring. The following week, Cesaro and Sheamus won a number one contender's tag team turmoil match against Enzo Amore and Big Cass, Heath Slater and Rhyno, Luke Gallows and Karl Anderson, and The Golden Truth (Goldust and R-Truth), for another title opportunity. After the final match of the tag team turmoil, Cesaro and Sheamus continued to attack The Golden Truth, but The Hardy Boyz came out for the save and Cesaro and Sheamus retreated. The following week, the tag team title match was scheduled for Extreme Rules and Jeff defeated Sheamus. On the May 22 episode of Raw, Matt faced Sheamus in a match where the winner chose the stipulation for their Extreme Rules tag team championship bout. Matt won and decided on a Steel Cage match.

At Payback, Alexa Bliss defeated Bayley to win her first Raw Women's Championship, as well as becoming the first woman to win both the Raw Women's Championship and SmackDown Women's Championship. The following night on Raw, Bliss had a coronation for both accomplishments. The other seven female wrestlers on the Raw roster were also in the ring. She insulted Mickie James, Sasha Banks, and Bayley before a brawl broke out that resulted in an eight-woman tag team match where the team of Bliss, Nia Jax, Emma, and Alicia Fox defeated the team of Bayley, Banks, James, and Dana Brooke. The following week, Bliss aligned with Jax and defeated James. After the match, Bliss continued to attack James. Bayley came out for the save and chased Bliss backstage. Jax then attacked James. On the May 15 episode of Raw, Bayley confronted Bliss and invoked her championship rematch for Extreme Rules. A brawl ensued and Bliss found a kendo stick under the ring and attacked Bayley with it. Later, their Raw Women's Championship match at Extreme Rules was made a Kendo Stick-on-a-Pole match. The following week, after Bliss defeated James, Bliss retrieved a kendo stick from under the ring and attacked James with it. Bayley came out for the save, but Bliss retreated. On the final Raw before Extreme Rules, Bliss did a controversial "This Is Your Life" segment for Bayley in an attempt to embarrass her by interviewing people from Bayley's past, including her school teacher, her school friend, and her ex-boyfriend. Bayley came out and attacked Bliss, but Bliss retaliated with a kendo stick. The segment was very poorly received by fans and critics.

At Payback, Austin Aries defeated Cruiserweight Champion Neville by disqualification, but Neville kept the title. The following night on Raw, T. J. Perkins, now going by TJP, was defeated by Aries, but after the match, TJP attacked Aries and injured his leg. The following week, TJP defeated Gentleman Jack Gallagher. After the match, TJP continued to attack Gallagher, who was saved by Aries. The following night on 205 Live, Neville said that TJP was deserving of a title shot for his attack on Aries, but TJP did not defeat Aries. The next week on Raw, it was announced that Aries would have another title opportunity against Neville at Extreme Rules. Neville and TJP then defeated Aries and Gallagher in a tag team match. On the following 205 Live, Aries defeated TJP by submission. It was then revealed that Aries and Neville's WWE Cruiserweight Championship bout at Extreme Rules would be a submission match. On the May 29 episode of Raw, Aries and Gallagher defeated Neville and TJP in a tag team rematch when Aries made Neville submit, the first time Neville ever submitted. The following night on 205 Live, Aries stated that he would make Neville submit again at Extreme Rules. He was then attacked from behind by TJP and Neville applied the Rings of Saturn on Aries while TJP continued to attack Aries' leg and Aries passed out.

Also in the cruiserweight division, Noam Dar had been dating Alicia Fox. Fox then began receiving gifts from an anonymous sender on 205 Live. Rich Swann revealed that he was the one sending the gifts, but Dar tried to claim credit, including the final gift, which ended up exploding powder in Fox's face. Fox then split from Dar, which was Swann's intention as Fox had previously dated Swann's friend Cedric Alexander and split from him. However, Dar and Fox reunited after Dar defeated Swann on the May 2 episode of 205 Live. On the May 8 episode of Raw, Sasha Banks began a feud with Fox, where the two traded wins over the next couple of weeks. After Banks defeated Fox on the May 22 episode of Raw, Dar confronted Banks, who attacked him, but Fox attacked Banks with a scissors kick. A mixed tag team match featuring Swann and Banks against Dar and Fox was scheduled for Extreme Rules. Banks then appeared for the first time on 205 Live on May 30, where she accompanied Swann for his match against Dar, which Dar won.

After being moved to Raw during the Superstar Shake-up, Apollo Crews caught the attention of Titus O'Neil, who offered to become his manager as part of "The Titus Brand". Crews accepted and started displaying attitude and cockiness, which caused his friend Kalisto, who also moved to Raw during the shake-up, to confront him. The two had a match, where Kalisto defeated Crews. On June 4, a rematch between the two was scheduled for the Extreme Rules Kickoff pre-show.

Event

Pre-show 
During the Extreme Rules Kickoff pre-show, Kalisto faced Apollo Crews, who was accompanied by Titus O'Neil. In the climax, as Crews argued with O'Neil, Kalisto performed "Salida Del Sol" on Crews to win the match.

Preliminary matches 
The actual pay-per-view opened with Dean Ambrose defending the Intercontinental Championship against The Miz, with the stipulation that if Ambrose was disqualified, he would lose the title. During the match, Maryse slapped Miz in front of the referee in an attempt to get Ambrose disqualified, however, the referee knew Maryse's actions and opted not to disqualify Ambrose and in the process, Maryse was evicted from ringside. In the end, Miz shoved Ambrose into the referee, who considered disqualifying Ambrose. Whilst Ambrose was distracted, Miz performed a "Skull Crushing Finale" on Ambrose to win the title for the seventh time.

Next, Rich Swann and Sasha Banks faced Noam Dar and Alicia Fox in a mixed tag team match. The match ended when Swann performed a "Phoenix Splash" on Dar for the win.

After that, Alexa Bliss defended the Raw Women's Championship against Bayley in a Kendo Stick-on-a-Pole match. Bayley was able to grab the kendo stick, but Bliss ducked the shot and knocked Bayley down. Bliss then struck Bayley with the kendo stick multiple times. Bayley was able to perform a Bayley-to-Belly suplex on Bliss, but couldn't capitalize. Bliss took advantage with more kendo stick shots and performed a Snap DDT on Bayley to retain the title.

In the next match, The Hardy Boyz defended the Raw Tag Team Championship against Cesaro and Sheamus in a Steel Cage match, which could only be won if both members of a team escaped the cage. In the end, Jeff performed "Whisper in the Wind" off the cage on both Cesaro and Sheamus. As Matt attempted to pull Jeff through the cage door, Cesaro and Sheamus climbed and narrowly escaped the cage before The Hardys to regain the titles for a second time. This was also The Hardy Boyz first loss since their return at WrestleMania 33.

In the penultimate match, Neville defended the WWE Cruiserweight Championship against Austin Aries. In the end, Neville performed a "Red Arrow" to Aries' back and forced Aries to submit to the "Rings of Saturn" to retain the title.

Main event  
In the main event, Roman Reigns, Seth Rollins, Bray Wyatt, Finn Bálor, and Samoa Joe competed in an Extreme Rules match to determine the number one contender against Brock Lesnar for the Universal Championship at Great Balls of Fire. After Wyatt and Joe attacked Reigns and Rollins with the steel steps, Wyatt performed a DDT on Rollins onto the steel steps. Joe applied the "Coquina Clutch" on Bálor, who escaped. Wyatt performed a side slam on Reigns onto an announce table. Joe applied the "Coquina Clutch" on Wyatt, but Bálor struck Joe with a chair. Reigns performed a spear through the barricade on Bálor and Joe. Rollins performed a frog splash on Wyatt through an announce table. Bálor performed a "Coup de Grâce" on Reigns, but as Bálor attempted a pin, Joe applied the "Coquina Clutch" on Bálor, who passed out, giving Joe the win by technical submission and becoming the number one contender for the Universal Championship.

Aftermath 
The following night on Raw, Samoa Joe confronted Brock Lesnar's advocate Paul Heyman. Joe said that unlike many others, he did not fear Lesnar and wanted to face him. Joe then applied the Coquina Clutch on Heyman to send a message to Lesnar, who returned the following week and brawled with Joe. 

Also on the post-Extreme Rules Raw, the other four participants of the fatal five-way were scheduled to face each other in singles matches. Roman Reigns defeated Bray Wyatt and Seth Rollins was scheduled to face Finn Bálor, but General Manager Kurt Angle instead booked Rollins to face Joe due to Joe's attack on Heyman. In the climax, Wyatt's music played and distracted Rollins, giving Joe the win, and beginning a feud between Rollins and Wyatt.

Dean Ambrose attacked Elias Samson during his segment and demanded a rematch against The Miz, who appeared on the TitanTron and said that Ambrose would not be getting a rematch as Miz was having a celebration. Samson then attacked Ambrose. Later, The Miz had his celebration on becoming a seven-time Intercontinental Champion, which was crashed by Ambrose, who attacked Miz with Dirty Deeds.

After defeating Heath Slater and Rhyno, new Raw Tag Team Champions Cesaro and Sheamus taunted The Hardy Boyz for picking a stipulation that they thought would give them the advantage. The Hardy Boyz then invoked their championship rematch for the following week in a two-out-of-three falls match. After tying the match 1-1, it ended in a double countout, thus Cesaro and Sheamus retained the title.

TJP confronted WWE Cruiserweight Champion Neville about their agreement, and Neville said that TJP deserved a title shot. Later, after TJP defeated Mustafa Ali, Neville attacked TJP and said he would get his title shot the next night on 205 Live, where Neville retained. This would be Austin Aries' final PPV match with WWE as he was released on July 7.

After retaining her Raw Women's Championship, General Manager Kurt Angle scheduled Alexa Bliss to defend her title against Nia Jax that night on Raw, as she had promised Jax a title shot after she defeated Bayley. The match ended in a disqualification win for Bliss after she intentionally got Mickie James and Dana Brooke, who were at ringside, to attack her. The following week, Bayley said in a sit-down interview that she had never been in a match like that before, but she would eventually recapture the Raw Women's Championship.

Titus O'Neil, accompanied by Apollo Crews, decided to face Kalisto himself, but was defeated. The following night on 205 Live, Titus tried to recruit Akira Tozawa, as per recommendation from Crews, to "The Titus Brand".

The 2017 Extreme Rules would in turn be the only Extreme Rules event during the second brand split to be a brand-exclusive show. Following WrestleMania 34 the following year, brand-exclusive pay-per-views were discontinued.

Results

References

External links 
 

2017
2017 WWE Network events
2017 in Maryland
Events in Baltimore
Professional wrestling in Baltimore
2017 WWE pay-per-view events
June 2017 events in the United States
WWE Raw